The Volkswagen wasserboxer is a four cylinder horizontally opposed pushrod overhead-valve (OHV) petrol engine developed by Volkswagen. It was available in two displacements – either a 1.9-litre or a 2.1-litre; the 2.1-litre being a longer stroke version of the 1.9-litre, both variants sharing the same cylinder bore. This engine was unique to the Volkswagen Type 2 (T3) (Transporter T3 / Caravelle / Vanagon / T25), having never been used in any other vehicle. Volkswagen contracted Oettinger to develop a six-cylinder version of this engine. Volkswagen decided not to use it, but Oettinger sold a Volkswagen Type 2 (T3) equipped with this engine.

Design detail
The wasserboxer featured a cast aluminium alloy cylinder block, cylinder heads, and pistons; and a die-forged steel flat plane crankshaft with four main bearings.

The wasserboxer, as with all Volkswagen boxer engines, directly drives the three-bearing camshaft via a small steel gear on the crankshaft, and a large aluminium one on the camshaft, so there is no timing belt or timing chain.  The entire mechanism is internal to the engine, so there should be no concerns regarding wear or replacements, as long as the engine oil is changed regularly.  The overhead poppet valves each feature two concentric valve springs, and are operated by pushrods, with adjustable rocker arms to facilitate valve clearance adjustment.

It also featured a "Heron cylinder head", or "bowl-in-piston" type combustion chambers – where the combustion takes place within the piston area, and not in a recess machined in the cylinder head.

The cylinder banks contain cast iron cylinder liners inserted into the crankcase surrounded by a water jacket, with a "rubber lip" style water jacket seal, which is a very different design as compared to most engines.  The top of the cylinder liners is pressed into a recessed cut-out in the cylinder heads, that are sealed with compressible metal rings, to prevent leakage.

Some wasserboxers were plagued by water jacket gasket failures (often erroneously referred to as head gaskets) due to several design issues.  Engine failure was also a result of poorly placed sensors, corrosion in the cooling system, often caused by using phosphated coolant, and many areas were subjected to leaks.

The switch to water-cooling for the boxer engines was made mid-year in 1982, because Volkswagen could no longer make the air-cooled engines meet emissions standards.  (The previous generation Volkswagen Type 2 (T2), produced in Brazil until 2013, was changed to water-cooled engines on 23 December 2005 in response to Brazil's emission laws; the power plant used in the previous-generation T2 was an Audi-sourced inline four.) Water-cooled T2 models can be distinguished by a second radiator grille.

Variants
All data from ETKA and Owner's Manuals.

See also
List of discontinued Volkswagen Group petrol engines

References

External links

Boxer engines
Volkswagen Group engines